Cycle of Suffering is the fifth studio album by British heavy metal band Sylosis, released on 7 February 2020 through Nuclear Blast. It is the band's first studio album since their hiatus in 2016, as well as their first to feature bassist Conor Marshall and drummer Ali Richardson, replacing Carl Parnell and Rob Callard.

A music video for the song "I Sever", the first single from Cycle of Suffering, was released for streaming on 6 December 2019.

The band is mostly playing in D standard tuning on Cycle of Suffering instead of E standard tuning on their previous albums.

Track listing

Personnel

Sylosis
 Josh Middleton – guitars, vocals
 Alex Bailey – guitars
 Conor Marshall – bass
 Ali Richardson – drums

Additional personnel
 Josh Middleton – production, mixing, cover art
 Ermin Hamidovic – mastering, additional mixing
 Dan Goldsworthy – layout, design

Charts

See also
List of 2020 albums

References

External links
 Official website

2020 albums
Sylosis albums
Nuclear Blast albums